The Perth Herald & Post was a weekly Scottish freesheet that delivered to households in the Perth and Kinross areas. The paper was launched in 2004, but has now ceased publication. 

It consisted mainly of advertising and promotional pieces, with some editorial relating to local news and sport. It had a circulation of 20,000 and was owned by Johnston Press, which also owns The Scotsman and Edinburgh Evening News.

Newspapers published in Scotland
Mass media in Perth, Scotland
Newspapers published by Johnston Press